Vernonia anamallica is a species of perennial plant from family Asteraceae. It is endemic to India.

References 

anamallica
Flora of India (region)